The 1995 Copper Bowl was an American  college football bowl game play on December 27, 1995, at Arizona Stadium in  Tucson, Arizona.  It was the seventh edition of the annual bowl Copper Bowl—now known as the Guaranteed Rate Bowl.  The game featured the Texas Tech Red Raiders, and the Air Force Falcons.

Background
The Red Raiders were 1-2 against ranked opponents, losing to #4 Penn State and #13 Texas but beating #8 Texas A&M. They finished tied for 2nd in the Southwest Conference with Texas A&M and Baylor. This was Texas Tech's third bowl game in two seasons. Air Force finished as co-champion of the Western Athletic Conference in a rare four-way tie, with Colorado State, BYU, and Utah. Air Force had beaten BYU to begin the season, but they lost to Colorado State and Utah. However, they were the only one of the four to be invited to a bowl game, their 7th in 10 seasons.

Game summary
Texas Tech – Stacy Mitchell 38 yard touchdown pass from Zebbie Lethridge (Tony Rogers kick), 14:27 remaining
Air Force – Nakia Addison 2 yard touchdown run (Thompson kick), 8:20 remaining
Texas Tech – Byron Hanspard 2 yard touchdown run (Rogers kick), 6:19 remaining
Texas Tech – Hanspard 11 yard touchdown run (Rogers kick), 0:23 remaining
Texas Tech – Lethridge 1 yard touchdown run (Rogers kick), 8:25 remaining
Air Force – Danta Johnson 71 yard touchdown (kick failed), 1:59 remaining
Texas Tech – Rogers 24 field goal, 0:03 remaining
Air Force – Jake Campbell 7 yard touchdown run (Addison run), 11:26 remaining
Air Force – Johnson 60 yard touchdown run (Roberts kick), 8:00 remaining
Texas Tech – Hanspard 2 yard touchdown run (Rogers kick), 5:06 remaining
Texas Tech – Lethridge 3 yard touchdown run (Rogers kick), 14:51 remaining
Texas Tech – Rogers 31 yard field goal, 11:15 remaining
Air Force – Beau Morgan 1 yard touchdown run (Roberts kick), 7:09 remaining
Texas Tech – Hanspard 29 yard touchdown run (Rogers kick), 4:59 remaining
Air Force – Addison 7 yard touchdown run (Roberts kick), 0:37 remaining

Texas Tech scored first on a 38-yard pass from quarterback Zebbie Lethridge to Stacy Mitchell. Air Force countered with a 2-yard run from Nakia Addison to tie it 7–7, but Texas Tech scored the next three touchdowns, amassing a 31–13 lead by halftime. In the second half, Air Force came within a field goal of the lead at 31–28 with a 60-yard run from Danta Johnson, but Texas Tech running back Byron Hanspard came alive with 201 yards and two of his four touchdowns in the second half, leading the Red Raiders to a 55–41 victory. Byron Hanspard rushed for 260 yards on 24 carries and four touchdowns while also catching two passes for 18 yards.

Statistics

Aftermath
Both teams went to two more bowl games before the decade ended, although Texas Tech did not win another bowl game until 2002 while Air Force won in 1998.

References

External links
 

Copper Bowl
Guaranteed Rate Bowl
Air Force Falcons football bowl games
Texas Tech Red Raiders football bowl games
Sports in Tucson, Arizona
Copper Bowl
December 1995 sports events in the United States
Events in Tucson, Arizona